See Wai Hun (also known as Wai Hun), is a Malaysian financial technology professional. She is the co-founder and CEO of JurisTech, a fintech company based in Malaysia.

Early life and education
Wai Hun pursued a bachelor's degree in accounting at Tunku Abdul Rahman University College. Halfway through, she enrolled to a computer science program in Sedaya College. She later earned her bachelor's degree in business computing from the University of Winnipeg. She graduated as a gold medalist from the University of Winnipeg for being the best graduate in her year.

Career

Wai Hun started her career as a consultant at Ernst & Young. She soon switched to a position of a business analyst at Sistemaju before joining Sapura to develop and implement business intelligence solutions. At Sapura, Wai Hun met John Lim, a Malaysian software developer who would eventually become the Chief Technological Officer of JurisTech.

Wai Hun and John Lim started Natsoft(M) Sdn Bhd, the parent company of JurisTech in 1997 amidst the Asian Financial Crisis. Their company was initially poised to sell data mining, AI, and data analytics tools and services to banks. However, the initial offering was not successful because the markets weren't ready for data mining and AI solutions at the time. Another factor that influenced this is the Asian Financial Crisis, which was the reason why hardly any company could afford such services. Then Wai Hun and John Lim decided to offer debt collection and litigation software to cope with existing market needs. This new approach was an instant success for her.

Awards and accolades

In 2014, Wai Hun became an Endeavor entrepreneur, a non-profit organization.

In 2016, See Wai Hun was profiled as Digerati50 by Focus Malaysia and Digital News Asia as one of the top 50 people who would shape the digital economy in  Malaysia in the coming years.

Wai Hun was featured in Chris Zook and James Allen's book The Founder's Mentality and in Freda Liu's book Bursting Fixed Mindsets,.

In 2019, Wai Hun was awarded Ernst & Young Woman Entrepreneur Of The Year award.

References

Year of birth missing (living people)
Malaysian businesspeople
Living people